Correspondence may refer to:

In general usage, non-concurrent, remote communication between people, including letters, email, newsgroups, Internet forums, blogs.

Science
Correspondence principle (physics): quantum physics theories must agree with classical physics theories when applied to large quantum numbers
Correspondence principle (sociology), the relationship between social class and available education
Correspondence problem (computer vision), finding depth information in stereography
Regular sound correspondence (linguistics), see Comparative method (linguistics)

Mathematics 
 Binary relation
 1:1 correspondence, an older name for a bijection
 Multivalued function
 Correspondence (algebraic geometry), between two algebraic varieties
 Correspondence (category theory), the opposite of a profunctor
 Correspondence (von Neumann algebra) or bimodule, a type of Hilbert space
 Correspondence analysis, a multivariate statistical technique

Philosophy and religion
Correspondence theory of truth, a theory in epistemology
Correspondence (theology), the relationship between spiritual and physical realities
Table of magical correspondences, list of relations between various items used in ceremonial magic

Entertainment
Correspondence chess played between different geographical locations
Correspondence (album), a 1983 studio album by singer and musician Peter Godwin
The Correspondence, a 2016 film by Giuseppe Tornatore, featuring Jeremy Irons
Correspondences (Babbitt), a 1967 musical work by Milton Babbitt

Other uses
Correspondence course, a distant education method

See also
Correspondent (disambiguation)
La Correspondencia (disambiguation)